Laurie Baker (1917–2007) is a male British-born Indian architect.

Laurie Baker may also refer to:

Laurie Baker (ice hockey) (born 1976), female American ice hockey player
Laurie Scott Baker (born 1943), male British composer and musician
Laurie Baker (figure skater) in 1991 World Junior Figure Skating Championships

See also
Laurence Baker (disambiguation)
Lawrence Baker (disambiguation)
Larry Baker (disambiguation)